Pasi Ikonen (born 30 June 1980 in Vihanti) is a Finnish orienteering competitor, winner of the 2001 World Orienteering Championships, Short distance, and also silver on the Sprint distance same year. In France 2011, he won silver on the long distance. He also has a Relay bronze medal from 2007.

See also
 List of orienteers
 List of orienteering events

References

External links
 

1980 births
Living people
People from Raahe
Finnish orienteers
Male orienteers
Foot orienteers
World Orienteering Championships medalists
Competitors at the 2009 World Games
Sportspeople from North Ostrobothnia
Junior World Orienteering Championships medalists